The 2018 Toray Pan Pacific Open is a women's tennis tournament played on indoor hard courts. It was the 35th edition of the Pan Pacific Open, and part of the Premier Series of the 2018 WTA Tour. It took place at the Arena Tachikawa Tachihi in Tachikawa, Tokyo, Japan, on 17–23 September 2018.

Points and prize money

Point distribution

Prize money

Singles main-draw entrants

Seeds

 Rankings are as of September 10, 2018

Other entrants
The following players received wild cards into the main singles draw:
  Victoria Azarenka
  Kurumi Nara
  Kristýna Plíšková
  Caroline Wozniacki

The following players received entry from the singles qualifying draw:
  Eugenie Bouchard
  Gabriela Dabrowski
  Zarina Diyas
  Misaki Doi
  Nao Hibino
  Alison Riske

Withdrawals
  Mihaela Buzărnescu → replaced by  Aliaksandra Sasnovich
  Angelique Kerber → replaced by  Belinda Bencic
  Madison Keys → replaced by  Anett Kontaveit
  Elise Mertens → replaced by  Anastasia Pavlyuchenkova
  Anastasija Sevastova → replaced by  Camila Giorgi
  Carla Suárez Navarro → replaced by  Donna Vekić

Retirements
  Victoria Azarenka

Doubles main-draw entrants

Seeds

 Rankings are as of September 10, 2018

Other entrants 
The following pair received a wildcard into the doubles main draw:
  Erina Hayashi /  Moyuka Uchijima

Champions

Singles

  Karolína Plíšková def.  Naomi Osaka 6–4, 6–4

Doubles

  Miyu Kato /  Makoto Ninomiya def.  Andrea Sestini Hlaváčková /  Barbora Strýcová, 6–4, 6–4

References

External links 
 

 
2018 WTA Tour
2018
2018 in Japanese women's sport
September 2018 sports events in Japan
Pan
2018 in Tokyo